Chambers may refer to:

Places

Canada
Chambers Township, Ontario

United States
Chambers, Arizona
Chambers, Nebraska
Chambers, West Virginia
Chambers Branch, a stream in Kansas
Chambers County, Alabama
Chambers County, Texas
Chambers Township, Holt County, Nebraska

Businesses and products
 Chambers (publisher), formerly  Chambers Publishers
 Chambers Dictionary, first published 1872
 Chambers Biographical Dictionary, first published in 1897
 Chambers's Encyclopaedia, 1859–1979
 Chambers Communications, an American broadcasting company
 Chambers and Partners, producing rankings for the legal industry
 Chambers stove, cooking appliances sold under the Chambers brand

Other uses
 Chambers (album), by Steady & Co., 2001
 Chambers (series), a British radio and TV sitcom
 Chambers (ship), the name of several ships
 Chambers (surname), including a list of people with the name
 Chambers (TV series), a 2019 supernatural horror show
 Barristers' chambers, rooms used by barristers
 Judge's chambers, the office of a judge

See also 

 Chamber (disambiguation)
 Chambers Building (disambiguation)
 Chambers House (disambiguation)
 Chambers Lake (disambiguation)
 Chambers Street (disambiguation)
 Justice Chambers (disambiguation)
 Hedingham & Chambers, an English bus company